Bernard Martin may refer to:

 Bernard Martin (New Zealand politician) (1882–1956), New Zealand politician of the Labour Party
 Bernard F. Martin (1845–1914), American politician from Manhattan, New York City
 Bernard Martin (rugby league) (1909–1991), Australian rugby league player
 Bernard Martin (athlete) (born 1943), French sprinter
Bernard Martin (environmentalist) (born 1954), Canadian fisherman and environmentalist